Omari Golaya (born 21 March 1954) is a Tanzanian boxer. He competed in the men's lightweight event at the 1980 Summer Olympics.

References

1954 births
Living people
Tanzanian male boxers
Olympic boxers of Tanzania
Boxers at the 1980 Summer Olympics
Place of birth missing (living people)
Lightweight boxers